The Cardinals–Seahawks rivalry is an American football rivalry between the National Football League (NFL)'s Arizona Cardinals and Seattle Seahawks. This is one of the newer rivalries in the NFL, emerging in the early 2000s, as the two teams only became rivals after both were relocated to the NFC West as a result of the league's realignment in 2002.  This rivalry has become one of the NFL's more bitter in recent years, as the mid-to-late 2010s often saw the Seahawks and Cardinals squaring off for NFC West supremacy. 

Seattle leads the series 25–22–1. The two teams have yet to meet in the playoffs.

History

1976–2001: Early years
The Seahawks came into the league in 1976 as an expansion team and play the Cardinals six times as an inter-conference opponent. As a St. Louis-based team, the Cardinals won both meetings between the two franchises, and as an Arizona-based franchise, the Cardinals went 3–1 against the Seahawks. The Cardinals won the first five games of the series until the Seahawks beat the Cardinals 33–14 at the Kingdome in 1998.

2002–2011: Move to NFC West
The rivalry between the Cardinals and Seahawks became a full-fledged one in 2002, when the two teams were placed in the NFC West as part of the NFL realignment. The teams split their 2000s meetings, going 8–8 against each other. Both teams swept the other en route to Super Bowl appearances, with the Seahawks sweeping the Cardinals in 2005 en route to a Super Bowl XL berth and the Cardinals returning the favor in 2008 en route to an appearance in Super Bowl XLIII.

In 2010, the Seahawks hired Pete Carroll as head coach. Carroll won his first three meetings against the Cardinals as Seahawks coach, before the Cardinals beat the Seahawks 23–20 in overtime in the final week of the 2011 season.

2012–2018: Fight for NFC West supremacy
In 2012, the Seahawks drafted Russell Wilson in the third round of the 2012 NFL Draft. After winning the starting job, Wilson's first game with the Seahawks was against the Cardinals in Arizona. With a last-second goal-line stand, the Cardinals won 20–16, which would be their last home win over the Seahawks until 2020. The Seahawks, however, exacted revenge with a 58–0 home win in Week 14. The Seahawks defense, which had become known as the Legion of Boom by this point, intercepted Cardinals quarterback John Skelton four times and scored two defensive touchdowns, while running back Marshawn Lynch scored three rushing touchdowns in the victory.

The next year, the Cardinals hired Bruce Arians as head coach and traded for quarterback Carson Palmer. Although Palmer lost his first game against the Seahawks at home in Week 7, he would overcome four interceptions to lead a last-second touchdown drive that would win the Week 16 rematch 17–10. Both teams finished with double-digit wins, but while the 13–3 Seahawks won the division (and went on to win Super Bowl XLVIII), the 10–6 Cardinals missed the playoffs. 

In 2014, the Cardinals jumped out to a 9–1 start while the Seahawks began the season 6–3. However, Palmer suffered a torn ACL in Week 10 and missed both meetings against the Seahawks that season, which led to the Seahawks accumulating their first sweep of the Cardinals since 2010. This included a 35–6 Sunday Night Football road win in Week 16 that clinched the division for the Seahawks for the second-straight season. The Seahawks went on to Super Bowl XLIX, which was coincidentally held in the Cardinals home stadium, but lost to the Patriots in their quest to repeat as Super Bowl champions. The Cardinals, meanwhile, qualified for the playoffs with an 11–5 record as a Wild Card, but lost to the Carolina Panthers.

The following year, the Cardinals won the NFC West for the first time since 2009 with a 13–3 record. The Seahawks, meanwhile, suffered a Super Bowl hangover with a 10–6 record. The two teams split their meetings, with the Cardinals winning the Week 10 meeting in Seattle 39–32, and the Seahawks blowing out the Cardinals 36–6 in the season finale in Arizona. Both teams once again made the playoffs, and both would go on to lose to eventual NFC champion Carolina, with the Seahawks falling in the Divisional Round and the Cardinals in the NFC Championship Game. This is the last time both teams made the playoffs in the same season to date.

The Cardinals and Seahawks played to a 6–6 tie in their Week 7 Sunday Night meeting in Arizona, which was also the first tie on Sunday Night Football. Cardinals kicker Chandler Catanzaro and his Seattle counterpart, Stephen Hauschka, each missed field goals that would have won the game for either team. Catanzaro, however, kicked the game-winning field goal during the meeting in Seattle that gave the Cardinals a 34–31 victory. Seattle won the NFC West with a 10–5–1 record, while the Cardinals missed the playoffs with a 7–8–1 record, their first losing season since 2012.

Both teams missed the playoffs in 2017, with a Week 17 Cardinals victory in Seattle sealing Seattle's playoff fate. Both Arians and Palmer retired after the season, with Palmer missing both meetings against Seattle again, this time due to a broken arm sustained in Week 7. The Seahawks would go 10–6 in 2018 and sweep the Cardinals, who finished with a league-worst 3–13 record to clinch the first overall pick in the following draft.

2019–present: Kyler Murray arrives, Russell Wilson leaves
The Cardinals drafted quarterback Kyler Murray in 2019 with the first overall pick. His first meeting against Wilson was a 27–10 home loss in Week 4 that was highlighted by newly-acquired Seahawks defensive end Jadeveon Clowney intercepting a Murray screen pass that he returned 27 yards for the game's first touchdown. The Cardinals, however, beat the Seahawks in the Week 16 rematch behind 166 rushing yards and three scores from running back Kenyan Drake.

In 2020, the 5–0 Seahawks traveled to Arizona to meet the 4–2 Cardinals for a Week 7 game that got flexed into the Sunday Night Football time slot due to COVID-19 concerns regarding the original matchup (Tampa Bay vs. Las Vegas). In a back-and-forth game that went into overtime, Murray and Wilson combined for 77 completions, 748 yards, and six touchdowns through the air. However, Wilson threw three costly interceptions, including one to Cardinals rookie linebacker Isaiah Simmons in overtime that set up Cardinals kicker Zane Gonzalez's game-winning field goal on the game's final play, resulting in the Cardinals handing the Seahawks their first loss of the season as well as beating the Seahawks at home for the first time since 2012. One of the highlights of the game was Seahawks wide receiver DK Metcalf chasing down Cardinals safety Budda Baker following  Baker intercepting Wilson. Metcalf tracked Baker down inside the 10-yard line following a 90-yard return, and his track down proved to be important as the Cardinals could not score in the four go-to-goal plays following Baker getting taken down. Four weeks later, the two teams now sporting identical 6–3 records met for a Thursday Night Football rematch in Seattle, which Seattle won after a fourth-down sack of Murray by Seahawks defensive end Carlos Dunlap late in the game. After the game in Seattle, the teams went in opposite directions going forward. The Cardinals proceeded to finish the season 8–8, winning only two of their final six games, and were eliminated from playoff contention altogether. Seattle, on the other hand, used the victory as a springboard to a 4–1 season finish, winning the NFC West with a 12–4 record.

The following season, the Cardinals and Seahawks met in Arizona during the final week of the season in a game that had significant playoff implications for the Cardinals. While the Seahawks had been eliminated from playoff contention and clinched their first losing season since 2011 two weeks prior, the Cardinals needed a win to clinch the division title, while a loss would lead to the Rams clinching the division. The Seahawks spoiled the Cardinals' chances of a division title with a 38–30 victory, with running back Rashaad Penny sealing the win with a 62-yard touchdown run.

Following the 2021 season, the Seahawks traded Wilson to the Denver Broncos. Wilson ended up compiling an 11–8–1 record against the Cardinals, including a 7–2–1 record in Arizona. Coincidentally, Wilson's first and last games as the Seahawks QB, as well as his first and last touchdown passes as a Seahawk, came against the Cardinals in Arizona.

Game results

|-
| 
| style="| Cardinals  30–24
| Kingdome
| Cardinals  1–0
| Seahawks join NFL as an expansion team and are placed in the NFC West. The following season, they were moved to the AFC West, where they remained through . First meeting at Kingdome.
|-
| 
| style="| Cardinals  33–28
| Busch Memorial Stadium
| Cardinals  2–0
| First meeting at Bush Memorial Stadium.
|-
| 
| style="| Cardinals  34–24
| Kingdome
| Cardinals  3–0
| Cardinals re-locate to Phoenix. 
|-
| 
| style="| Cardinals  30–27(OT)
| Kingdome
| Cardinals  4–0
| First meeting to go into overtime in the history of the rivalry.
|-
| 
| style="| Cardinals  20–14(OT)
| Sun Devil Stadium
| Cardinals  5–0
| First meeting in Sun Devil Stadium
|-
| 
| style="| Seahawks  33–14
| Kingdome
| Cardinals  5–1
| First Seahawks win in series. Final meeting at Kingdome.
|-

|-
| 
| Tie 1–1
| style="| Seahawks  27–6
| style="| Cardinals  24–13
| Cardinals  6–2
| Seahawks move to the NFC West as a result of NFL realignment. Seahawks open Seahawks Stadium (now known as Lumen Field).
|-
| 
| style="| 
| style="| Seahawks  38–0
| style="| Seahawks  28–10
| Cardinals  6–4
| Seahawks first series sweep.
|-
| 
| Tie 1–1
| style="| Cardinals  25–17
| style="| Seahawks  24–21
| Cardinals  7–5
|
|-
| 
| style="| 
| style="| Seahawks  33–19
| style="| Seahawks  37–12
| Tie  7–7
| Seahawks sweep division. Seahawks lose Super Bowl XL. Final meeting in Sun Devil Stadium.
|-
| 
| Tie 1–1
| style="| Cardinals  27–21
| style="| Seahawks  21–10
| Tie  8–8
| First meeting in University of Phoenix Stadium (known then as "State Farm Stadium").
|-
| 
| Tie 1–1
| style="| Cardinals  23–20
| style="| Seahawks  42–21
| Tie  9–9
|
|-
| 
| style="| 
| style="| Cardinals  34–21
| style="| Cardinals  26–20
| Cardinals  11–9
| Cardinals sweep division. Cardinals lose Super Bowl XLIII.
|-
| 
| style="| 
| style="| Cardinals  31–20
| style="| Cardinals  27–3
| Cardinals  13–9
| 
|-

|-
| 
| style="| 
| style="| Seahawks  36–18
| style="| Seahawks  22–10
| Cardinals  13–11
|
|-
| 
| Tie 1–1
| style="| Cardinals  23–20(OT)
| style="| Seahawks  13–10
| Cardinals  14–12
|
|-
| 
| Tie 1–1
| style="| Cardinals  20–16
| style="| Seahawks  58–0
| Cardinals  15-13
| Seahawks draft Russell Wilson. Seahawks' win in Seattle was their largest win in the rivalry.
|-
| 
| Tie 1–1
| style="| Seahawks  34–22
| style="| Cardinals  17–10
| Cardinals  16–14
| First meeting between Carson Palmer and Wilson. Seahawks win Super Bowl XLVIII.
|-
| 
| style="| 
| style="| Seahawks  35–6
| style="| Seahawks  19–3
| Tie  16–16
| Seahawks clinch NFC West with Week 16 win in Arizona. Seahawks lose Super Bowl XLIX.
|-
| 
| Tie 1–1
| style="| Seahawks  36–6
| style="| Cardinals  39–32
| Tie  17–17
| 
|-
| 
| style="| 
| Tie  
| style="| Cardinals  34–31
| Cardinals  18–17–1
| During the game in Arizona, Seattle's Stephen Hauschka and Arizona's Chandler Catanzaro each missed short field goals that would have won the game in overtime. Final meeting between Palmer and Wilson.
|-
| 
| Tie 1–1
| style="|Seahawks  22–16
| style="| Cardinals  26–24
| Cardinals  19–18–1
| Cardinals eliminate Seahawks from playoff contention with Week 17 win in Seattle.
|-
| 
| style="| 
| style="| Seahawks  27–24
| style="| Seahawks  20–17
| Seahawks  20–19–1
| Seahawks take the lead in their overall series with the Cardinals for the first time ever with their head-to-head home victory. Both games decided by last-second Seahawks field goals.
|-
| 
| Tie 1–1
| style="| Seahawks  27–10
| style="| Cardinals  27–13
| Seahawks  21–20–1
| Cardinals draft Kyler Murray.
|-

|-
| 
| Tie 1–1
| style="| Cardinals  37–34(OT)
| style="| Seahawks  28–21
| Seahawks  22–21–1
|
|-
| 
| Tie 1–1
| style="| Seahawks  38–30
| style="| Cardinals  23–13
| Seahawks  23–22–1
| Final start in the series for Russell Wilson. Game in Arizona was Wilson's final game as a Seahawk. Seahawks' victory in Arizona game denies the Cardinals the NFC West division.
|-
| 
| style="| 
| style="| Seahawks  31–21
| style="| Seahawks  19–9
| Seahawks  25–22–1
| Seahawks sweep Cardinals for first time since .
|-

|-
| Regular season
| style="|
| Seahawks 12–10–1
| Seahawks 13–12
| 
|-

References

General
 Cardinals vs Seahawks Results

Specific

National Football League rivalries
Arizona Cardinals
Seattle Seahawks
Seattle Seahawks rivalries
Arizona Cardinals rivalries